Black Comedy is a 2014 Hong Kong fantasy comedy film directed by Wilson Chin. It starred Chapman To, Wong Cho-lam and Kimmy Tong.

Plot
Johnny Du Kei-Fung (Wong Cho-Lam) is a Hong Kong detective who dreams of becoming a member of the exclusive G4 Team that protects the city's Chief Executive (Patrick Dunn). Johnny is deemed too short for the team and his application is denied. At home, Johnny is bullied by his girlfriend Angel (Kimmy Tong) as weak and unsuccessful.

Johnny meets Vincent (Chapman To), who offers him three wishes in exchange for his soul. His first wish is to be pursued by a beautiful woman, whom Vincent delivers in the form of "Juicy" (also played by Kimmy Tong). Johnny soon discovers that Juicy is indiscriminately passionate, which makes him concerned about possible infidelity. In response, Johnny uses his second wish to turn Juicy into the innocent and unfailingly loyal QQ. He soon discovers, that QQ is unintelligent and is the daughter of triad figure Brother Drill (Tommy Wong), a coincidence that leads the police to believe he is a triad mole.

In order to change his superior's (Benz Hui) view of him, Johnny ventures into a drug lord's lair hoping to solve a case, but he is killed. Vincent uses Johnny's third wish to reincarnate him as a wealthy, arrogant businessman in order for Johnny to complete his quest, win back Angel and protect the Chief Executive.

Cast

References

External links
 

2014 films
Hong Kong fantasy comedy films
2010s fantasy comedy films
2010s Cantonese-language films
Films set in Hong Kong
Films shot in Hong Kong
2014 comedy films
2010s Hong Kong films